Defeated Creek may refer to:

Streams
Defeated Creek (Hickman County, Tennessee), a stream
Defeated Creek (Knott County, Kentucky), a tributary to Carr Creek Lake
Defeated Creek (Letcher County, Kentucky), a stream
Defeated Creek (Smith County, Tennessee), a tributary to Cordell Hull Lake

Populated place
Defeated Creek, Kentucky, an unincorporated community in Letcher County